Statistics of Division 2 in the 1971–72 season.

Overview
It was contested by 48 teams, and CS Sedan Ardennes, Valenciennes and RC Strasbourg won the championship.

League tables

Group A

Group B

Group C

Championship play-offs

|}

References
France - List of final tables (RSSSF)

Ligue 2 seasons
French
2